WUBG (1570 kHz) is a Spanish CHR station licensed to serve Methuen, Massachusetts. It has an FM translator, W287CW, at 105.3 MHz. The station is called "LatinX". The WUBG transmitter is located in Andover, while W287CW's transmitter is in Medford. The station is owned by Costa-Eagle Radio Ventures Limited Partnership—a partnership between Pat Costa and The Eagle-Tribune

History
The station signed on the air as WMLO, a 500-watt radio station originally licensed to Beverly, Massachusetts, on December 22, 1963. It changed its call sign to WBVD on December 5, 1979 and to WNSH on July 1, 1984. Its studios have been located in Danvers, in Salem (at Pickering Wharf), in two different buildings at Endicott College in Beverly, and on the second floor of a hardware warehouse in Hamilton.

In 2011, Willow Farm, Inc. sold WNSH for $400,000 to Costa-Eagle Broadcasting. In March 2011, Costa-Eagle changed the station to "Viva 1570." The format changed from tropical music, simulcasting Costa-Eagle sister station WNNW, to Spanish adult contemporary. On November 26, 2012, the call letters were changed to WMVX. The station switched to a Brazilian Portuguese music and talk format in July 2014. On October 8, 2014, the New England Revolution soccer team announced that WMVX would become its Portuguese-language flagship station.

In January 2013, WMVX was granted a U.S. Federal Communications Commission (FCC) construction permit to increase daytime power to 50,000 watts. Even with the anticipated increase to 50,000 watts, the maximum AM power allowed by the FCC, the permit required the station to reduce power at night to 85 watts because 1570 kHz is a Mexican clear channel frequency and WMVX must protect XERF in Ciudad Acuña, Coahuila, the Class A station on 1570. In 2016, the station switched its city of license from Beverly to Methuen with its transmitter in Andover, Massachusetts.

The station changed its call sign to WCCM on April 1, 2017.  It swapped call letters with its sister station in Salem, New Hampshire. Also in 2017, the Brazilian Portuguese programming, branded "Nossa Radio," was dropped from the station.  Its programmer, the International Church of the Grace of God, bought WBIX the following year, to air programming for the Boston area's Brazilian and Portuguese listeners. WCCM then returned to simulcasting WNNW, and briefly ran a separate Spanish-language music format branded "Galaxia."

In March 2018, the station was heard simulcasting sister station WMVX (with an FM translator at 98.9 MHz), running classic hits as "Valley 98.9." On April 2, 2018, 1570 AM started broadcasting a classic hits format separate from WMVX.  On April 3, the call sign was changed to WUBG.

On July 1, 2019, WUBG's classic hits format went online-only, while 1570 AM and the 105.3 translator switched to EMF's "K-Love" contemporary Christian format.

On May 29, 2022, the station had dropped carrying the K-Love Christian programming for a simulcast of sister station Spanish CHR WCCM.

Translators
In addition to the main station, WUBG is relayed by an FM translator.

References

External links

FM Translator

1963 establishments in Massachusetts
Beverly, Massachusetts
Methuen, Massachusetts
Mass media in Essex County, Massachusetts
Radio stations established in 1963
UBG (AM)
UBG